Véronique Mathieu (born 28 October 1955 in Nancy, Meurthe-et-Moselle) is a French politician who served as a Member of the European Parliament from 1999 until 2014, representing the East of France. She is a member of the Radical Party, associated to the Union for a Popular Movement, part of the European People's Party.

From 2012 to 2013, Mathieu served on the special committee on organised crime, corruption and money laundering in the European Parliament.

References

1955 births
Living people
Politicians from Nancy, France
MEPs for East France 2004–2009
MEPs for East France 2009–2014
Radical Party (France) MEPs
MEPs for France 1999–2004
20th-century women MEPs for France
21st-century women MEPs for France
Articles containing video clips
Regional councillors of Grand Est